The men's marathon at the 1962 British Empire and Commonwealth Games as part of the athletics programme was held at the Perry Lakes Stadium on Thursday 29 November 1962.

The event was won by the European champion, Englishman Brian Kilby in 2:21:17.0, setting a new Games record. Kilby won by 58.6 seconds ahead of the defending champion Australian Dave Power and another Australian Rod Bonella who won the bronze medal.

New Zealand's Barry Magee who finished fourth in the 6 mile event earlier in the meet, was ruled unfit to start the race due to blistered feet.

Records

The following records were established during the competition:

Final

References

Men's marathon
1962
Comm
1962 Commonwealth Games